This list of Ports and harbours in Angola details the ports, harbours around the coast of Angola.

List of ports and harbours in Angola

External links

References

Ports

Angola